Salomon Benaïoun ( Sulaymān bin Ḥayyūn,  Solomon Ben Hayun; 1867-1921) was a Moroccan Jewish printer and journalist born in Oran in Algeria, whose family originally hailed from Tetouan. He moved to Tangier at the invitation of Haïm Benchimol (1834–1915), an important businessman and collaborator with the French.

He studied printing in Paris. He invested in modern printing equipment, which he sent to Tangier where he established the French Printing House on Qadi Street. He also had a photography studio.

He started the newspapers Kol Israel (1891), Mébasser Tov (1894-1895), and Moghrabi (1904), though these periodicals were short-lived. Benaïoun also founded  (1915-1922), which covered Jewish interests in Morocco in two different editions: one in Judeo-Arabic and one in French.

He also owned Maṭbaʻat Sulaymān bin Ḥayyūn.

References 

Moroccan Jews
Newspaper publishers (people)
Printers
1921 deaths
1867 births